Paras Shah (born 30 December 1971) is the former and last Crown Prince of Nepal, the heir apparent to the throne, from 2001 until the abolition of the monarchy by the Interim Constituent Assembly in 2008 following the Constituent Assembly election.

Education
Paras is the only son of the deposed King Gyanendra and Queen Komal of Nepal. He has one sister, Prerana. He received his early education at St. Joseph's School in Darjeeling, India; Budhanilkantha School, Kathmandu; and Laboratory School, Kathmandu. He later attended Luther College in Iowa, and the Schiller International University in the United Kingdom studying for an undergraduate degree in Business Administration. However, he did not complete his undergraduate education.

Family
Paras married Himani Rajya Lakshmi Devi Shah a member of the Princely family of Sikar on 25 January 2000. They have three children: Purnika Rajya Lakshmi Devi Shah (b. 12 December 2000), Hridayendra Bir Bikram Shah Dev (b. 30 July 2002) and Kritika Rajya Lakshmi Devi Shah (b. 16 October 2004).

Crown Prince (2001–2007)
On 1 June 2001, Paras was at the Royal Palace during the royal massacre, which resulted in the deaths of King Birendra and most of the Royal Family, including Crown Prince Dipendra. Paras sustained injuries in the massacre and, according to eyewitness accounts, saved the lives of at least three royals, including two children, by pulling a sofa over them. Gyanendra, who had held the title of King of Nepal briefly during the 1950s, was again crowned king. Paras, as King Gyanendra's only son, became Crown Prince of Nepal on 26 October 2001.

In July 2007, the Nepalese Prime Minister Girija Prasad Koirala called for then-King Gyanendra to abdicate the throne and for Paras to renounce his dynastic rights in favour of his son, Prince Hridayendra.

Conservation trust controversy
In 2008, the National Trust for Nature Conservation, published a report alleging that the Royal Family had misused funds belonging to the charity. The trust was formerly run by Crown Prince Paras, with King Gyanendra as its patron. The committee alleged that the Royal Family had spent large amounts of trust funds on themselves over several years to finance trips abroad, lavish parties, Queen Komal's health check-ups in the United Kingdom. One trip highlighted in the report was Crown Prince Paras' visit to Austria to donate a pair of Indian Rhinoceros, an endangered species in Nepal, to a zoo. As the charity is now run by Maoists, the objectivity of the findings has been questioned.

Brushes with the law
In August 2000, Paras was alleged to have run over and killed Praveen Gurung, a popular singer. A police investigation ensued, but Paras was not charged. An army officer later claimed responsibility for the incident.

Paras was reported to have fired a pistol into the air at a Chitwan hotel on 11 December 2010 under the influence of alcohol. He reportedly opened fire at Rubel Chaudhary, alleging that his family members had conspired to abolish Nepal's monarchy and also attempted to defame Nepal and Nepalis during his confrontations with the prince. He was arrested 3 days later for a court trial to be initiated on 19 December.

In July 2014, Paras was arrested on drugs charges in Thailand for a second time with the possibility of facing five years in prison.

Local newspapers had reported that the police arrested Paras with a green plastic tube used for drugs, and two similar plastic tubes from a BMW vehicle he was riding.

On 30 July 2021, Paras Shah was again in limelight after mistreating the police officer on duty. He had misbehaved at Narayan Gopal Chowk in Maharajgunj on Friday evening when the traffic police tried to interrogate him. Nepal police explained he was drunk and not wearing helmet. Later he apologized.

Heart attacks

On 6 September 2007, Paras was rushed to the Military Hospital after he complained of chest pain. Later, at around 11:30 am, he was transferred to the Norvic International Hospital in Kathmandu. He was operated on for about 50 minutes, apparently to treat a "mild heart attack". Doctors performed a balloon angioplasty on him to clear his blocked artery.

On 19 February 2013, Paras was admitted to Samitivej Hospital in Bangkok, Thailand after he suffered a second heart attack. After being in hospital for more than two weeks, Paras gained consciousness on 2 March.

On 28 January 2019 he suffered a third heart attack. Paras was admitted to Norvic International Hospital.

Ancestry

References

Further reading

External links
Royal Court of Nepal

Nepalese princes
1971 births
Living people
People from Kathmandu
Heirs apparent who never acceded
Members of the Order of Gorkha Dakshina Bahu, First Class
People of the Nepalese Civil War
21st-century Nepalese nobility
Nepalese Hindus